373 Melusina (prov. designation:  or ) is a large Main belt asteroid. It is classified as a C-type asteroid and is probably composed of carbonaceous material. It was discovered by Auguste Charlois on 15 September 1893 in Nice.

References

External links
 
 

Background asteroids
Melusina
Melusina
C-type asteroids (Tholen)
18930915